George Gifford Symes (April 28, 1840November 3, 1893) was an American lawyer, Republican politician, and pioneer of Wisconsin, Montana, and Colorado.  He was a member of congress, representing Colorado's at-large district during the 49th and 50th U.S. congresses (1885–1889), and was a justice of the Supreme Court of the Montana Territory.  Earlier in his life, he served as a Union Army officer in the American Civil War.

Biography

George G. Symes was born in Ashtabula County, Ohio, in April 1840.  He received his early education there, then moved with his parents to La Crosse, Wisconsin, in 1852, where he completed his education.  At age 20, he began the study of law in the offices of Angus Cameron (later a U.S. senator).

Civil War service

At the outbreak of the Civil War, he joined up with a company of volunteers for the Union Army, known as the "La Crosse Light Guard". His company became Company B in the 2nd Wisconsin Infantry Regiment, and mustered into federal service on April 12, 1861.  He was wounded at the First Battle of Bull Run, and was discharged due to his wounds in December.

After recovering from his wounds, he volunteered again and was commissioned adjutant of the 25th Wisconsin Infantry Regiment.  After one year as adjutant, he was promoted to captain of Company F in that regiment.  With the 25th Wisconsin Infantry, he participated in the Siege of Vicksburg and the Atlanta Campaign.  He was wounded again at Decatur, Georgia, in July 1864.

While recuperating, he was offered the command of the new 44th Wisconsin Infantry Regiment and accepted.  He returned to Wisconsin to assist in organizing the new regiment.  The 44th Wisconsin Infantry was called to service before fully organized, and five companies were sent forward under their lieutenant colonel in November 1864.  Symes completed the organization of the regiment and joined the advance battalion at Nashville, Tennessee, in February 1865.  They spent the remainder of the war on guard duty in Tennessee and Kentucky.

Political career
After the war, Symes remained in Paducah, Kentucky, where the 44th Wisconsin Infantry had been stationed.  In 1867, he was the Radical Republican nominee for United States House of Representatives in Kentucky's 1st congressional district.  He challenged Democratic incumbent, Lawrence S. Trimble, but was defeated.  He and another Republican candidate challenged their defeat in the election, claiming that Union voters had been intimidated and alleging that Trimble should be disqualified for having aided the rebellion.  The challenge was also unsuccessful.  

Symes continued working as a lawyer in Paducah until 1869, when he was appointed associate justice of the Supreme Court of the Montana Territory, by U.S. president Ulysses S. Grant.  He served only two years as justice, then resigned to resume the practice of law in Helena, Montana.

In 1874, Symes decided to relocate to Denver, Colorado, to establish a legal practice there.  The legal community of Montana threw him a banquet at his departure in February 1874, where his career was celebrated by prominent Montanans.

Symes was elected as a Republican to the Forty-ninth and Fiftieth Congresses (March 4, 1885 – March 3, 1889).
He engaged in the management of his estate and in the practice of law.

Suicide

Symes committed suicide on November 3, 1893, by shooting himself in the head.  He left a letter for his wife saying he feared another night in agony.  Symes had been wounded near the spine during his Civil War service, and had experienced significant discomfort and depression in the subsequent years.  By the time of his suicide, his condition had been exacerbated by four weeks of pneumonia.  At the time of his death, his wife had been living for a year in Massachusetts with their children, for her own health concerns.

He was interred in Denver's Fairmount Cemetery.

Personal life and family

George Symes was the eldest son of William Symes and his wife Mary ( Gifford).  His parents had emigrated to the United States from England in 1836.

George Symes married Sophie Foster on July 3, 1875, at Chicago.  Sophie was a daughter of prominent geologist John Wells Foster.  Their marriage produced at least three children.  Their eldest son was John Foster Symes, who served 28 years as a United States district judge in Colorado, and was earlier United States attorney in Colorado.

While serving in Congress, Symes lived at 1501 18th Street, N.W., in Washington, D.C., in the Dupont Circle Historic District.  His former home is now an annex of the Embassy of Malaysia.

References

External links
 

|-

|-

1840 births
1893 deaths
Suicides by firearm in Colorado
People from Ashtabula County, Ohio
Politicians from Helena, Montana
People of Wisconsin in the American Civil War
Union Army officers
Kentucky lawyers
Montana Territory judges
Republican Party members of the United States House of Representatives from Colorado
19th-century American politicians
19th-century American judges
19th-century American lawyers